Laila St. Matthew-Daniel (born February 14, 1953 in Lagos, Nigeria) is an executive coach, leadership trainer, speaker, author, women's rights activist and writer. She is the founder and President of ACTS Generation GBV, a non-governmental organization which combats domestic violence and child abuse in Nigeria. She has organized various protests for the rights of women and the girl-child, some of which are the Buni Yadi Massacre of February 2014 and part of initiating group who organized first protest against the Chibok schoolgirls kidnapping by the Boko Haram sect. She has organized various sensitization seminars and workshops to empower women on the issues of self mastery, self awareness, and self actualization.

References

1953 births
Living people
Nigerian women writers
Nigerian activists
Nigerian women's rights activists
Nigerian women activists